Harry Hinton (1909–1978) was an Australian former Grand Prix motorcycle road racer. He was born 31 JUL 1909 Birmingham. His best season was in 1950 when he finished ninth in the 500cc world championship. Hinton was the first Australian to score points in the premier 500cc division. After being injured in a crash at the 1951 Isle of Man Junior TT, Hinton left the European racing circuit, but continued to race in his native Australia. He died in 1978, at the age of 67.

Motorcycle Grand Prix results
1949 point system

Points system from 1950 to 1968

5 best results were counted up until 1955.

(key) (Races in italics indicate fastest lap)

References 

1909 births
1978 deaths
Sportspeople from Birmingham, West Midlands
Australian motorcycle racers
350cc World Championship riders
500cc World Championship riders
Isle of Man TT riders